is a professional Go player.

Biography 
Mimura became a professional in 1986. He was promoted to 9 dan in 2000. He is married to Makihata Taeko.

Promotion record

Titles and runners-up

External links
GoBase Profile
Nihon Ki-in Profile (Japanese)

1969 births
Living people
Japanese Go players
People from Kitakyushu